Tidswell is a surname. Notable people with the surname include:

 Charlotte Tidswell (c. 1760–1846), English actress
 Frank Tidswell (1867–1941), Australian physician
 Quinton Tidswell (1910–1991), Australian artist
 Thomas Tidswell (1870–1950), Australian architect

See also 

 Tideswell, village and parish in England
 Tidwell, surname page